Rychlik may refer to:
 Rychlik, Greater Poland Voivodeship
 Rychlik, Lubusz Voivodeship, a village in the administrative district of Gmina Sulęcin
 Rychlik (surname)

See also
 
 Rychliki
 Rychlak, a surname